Do You Remember Dolly Bell? is a 1981 comedy-drama film directed by Emir Kusturica, in his feature film directorial debut, and co-written by Kusturica and Abdulah Sidran, based on Sidran's 1979 novel of the same name. The film won Silver Lion for Best First Work at 1981 Venice Film Festival, and was selected as the Yugoslav entry for the Best Foreign Language Film at the 54th Academy Awards, but was not accepted as a nominee.

Plot
Set over a single 1963 summer in one of Sarajevo's neighbourhoods, the plot follows the fortunes of a school boy nicknamed Dino (Slavko Štimac) who grows up under the shadow of his good, but ailing, father. Simultaneous to being enthralled with a life that flashes before his eyes and ears in the local cinema and youth centre (where, among other things, he watches Alessandro Blasetti's European Nights and listens to Adriano Celentano's "24 Mila Baci"), Dino gets a taste of the world inhabited by local thugs and petty criminals. However, when he is rewarded via a liaison for providing a hiding place for prostitute "Dolly Bell" (Ljiljana Blagojević), his world is turned upside down as he falls in love with her.

Cast
 Slavko Štimac - Dino
 Slobodan Aligrudić - Father
 Ljiljana Blagojević - Dolly Bell
 Mira Banjac - Mother
 Pavle Vuisić - Uncle
 Nada Pani - Aunt
 Boro Stjepanović - Cvikeraš
 Žika Ristić - Čiča
 Jasmin Celo
 Mirsad Zulić
 Ismet Delahmet
 Jovanka Paripović
 Mahir Imamović
 Zakira Stjepanović
 Tomislav Gelić
 Sanela Spahović
 Fahrudin Ahmetbegović
 Samir Ruznić
 Dragan Suvak
 Aleksandar Zurovac

See also
 List of Yugoslavian films
 List of submissions to the 54th Academy Awards for Best Foreign Language Film
 List of Yugoslav submissions for the Academy Award for Best Foreign Language Film

References

External links
 

1981 films
1981 romantic comedy films
Yugoslav coming-of-age films
Films set in the 1960s
Films directed by Emir Kusturica
Serbo-Croatian-language films
Films set in Sarajevo
Yugoslav comedy films
Yugoslav romance films
Films set in Yugoslavia
Films about prostitution
Films set in Bosnia and Herzegovina